Jerome Sydenham (born 1967, Ibadan, Nigeria) is an electronic music producer, DJ and multi-record label owner known for establishing a pan-African electro direction within the house and techno genres.

Born and raised in Ibadan, Nigeria, Jerome Sydenham was schooled in his teens in England before migrating to New York City in the early 1980s to further his music interests with his family there. He is now based in Berlin, Germany running a stable of record labels including Ibadan Records as well as actively touring as a DJ and producing music.

Following a recording career, Jerome Sydenham released an album, Animal Social Club, on Ibadan Records in 2012, followed by a co-production project with Aybee and Ron Trent under the artist name S.A.T. which saw a release of an album of the same name in 2014 to acclaimed reviews.

A&R background
Sydenham was recruited into the A&R division of Atlantic Records in 1989.

In 1994, while at East West Records, owned by Warner Music Group, his underground dance music interests continued to run in tangent with his commercial A&R work as he largely succeeded in crossing dance over to the mainstream with albums by Ten City and Michael Watford. During this time, he also compiled one of the representations of early 1990s deep house with his "Underground Dance Classics Vol. 1" CD showcasing some of the earliest productions from a young Roger Sanchez, Murk and Pal Joey. It was there where he also met Kerri Chandler, releasing one of his records on Atlantic in 1990. The two would continue to be close friends and collaborators later in life along with Dennis Ferrer and Joe Claussell.

Music career
Sydenham landed his first DJ residency at the New York nightclub Nell's in 1987, which featured DJs such as Miss Kier from Deee-Lite. He passed a demo cassette to the venue and got a call to play when another DJ cancelled. Jerome Sydenham continued to play there for four years. By 1995, his DJ career went international while touring with Joe Claussell and Kerri Chandler.

That landmark year of his career, Jerome Sydenham also founded the Ibadan Records label and by 2000, his imprint was known for pioneering a fresh Tech-house sound with co-producer Dennis Ferrer. The series led to releases such as "Timbuktu", "Stockholm Go Bang!" and the crossover hit, "Sandcastles". In 2006, Sydenham followed up with two remixes "He Is" and Julian Jabre's "Swimming Places". Other releases include collaborations with Get Physical's Swedish talent Tiger Stripes and their "Elevation" as well as their remix of Faze Action's "In The Trees".

The year 2007 also saw the initiation of a new label collaboration, Avocado Records, established in Denmark with producer Rune RK with the monster track "Elephant".

Sydenham continued with a series of remixes such as Carl Craig's ‘Angel’ on Planet E, Adam Beyer & Joel Mull ‘Forming Dies’ on Drumcode, and another for Planetary Assault Systems ‘GT’ (Function & Jerome Sydenham Remix) on Mote Evolver.

A&R achievements
Jerome Sydenham received the follow Gold and Platinum records during his A&R involvement at Atlantic Records and East West Records:

Gold records
Yo-Yo – "You Can't Play with my Yo-Yo" feat Ice Cube (single) (1991)
LeVert – "Private Line" (single) (1991)
En Vogue – "My Lovin" (first single from Funky Divas) (1992)
En Vogue  – "Giving Him Something He Can Feel" (second single from Funky Divas) (1992)
En Vogue  – "Free Your Mind" (third single from Funky Divas) (1992)
En Vogue  – "Give It Up, Turn It Loose" (fourth single from Funky Divas) (1993)
Da Lench Mob – "Guerillas in Tha Mist" (album) (1992)
The Family Stand – "Ghetto Heaven" (album) (1990)
Das EFX – "They Want EFX" (single) (1992)
Das EFX – "Straight Up Sewaside" (album) (1993)

Platinum records
En Vogue  – "Born to Sing" (album) (1990)
En Vogue  – "Funky Divas" (album) (1990), US 5× Platinum
En Vogue  – "Hold On" (single from Born to Sing) (1992)
Simply Red – "Stars" (album) (1991), US 12× Platinum
Snow – "12 Inches of Snow" (album) (1992)
Snow – "Informer" (single) (1992)
Das EFX – "Dead Serious" (album) (1992)

Label management
Jerome Sydenham and his label, Ibadan Records, managed together with Christine Pedersen, is principal to several labels including:
Apotek Records
Avocado Records
Ibadan Records
Public Service Records
UK Promotions

Selected discography

Ibadan Records LP
2001: Saturday (with Kerri Chandler)

Ibadan Records EPs
2015: Rudra
2013: Sun Ark (with Carl Craig and Lo Hype)
2013: No Shade (with Aschka and Sylvie Floret)
2012: White Light (Remixes) (vs Function)
2012: I Adventure (with No Mad Ronin)
2011: Natural Spray (with Aschka)
2010: White Light (vs Function)
2010: Mobile / Skimming / Incense (with Function)
2010: Thick & Thin (with Argy and DJ Said)
2009: Jango 01
2009: Jango 02 (with Nikola Gala and DJ Oji)
2009: Brooklyn Rock (with Nikola Gala)
2008: Ebian (with Texu and Romantic Couch)
2008: Elevation & F12 Remixes (with Tiger Stripes)
2008: In the Barber Shop
2007: Timbuktu (with Dennis Ferrer)
2006: Sandcastles (with Dennis Ferrer)
2006: Son of Raw / Undertow / Back Door (with Dennis Ferrer)
2006: № 8 – Elevation (with Tiger Stripes)
2005: Stockholm – Go Bang! (with Mikael Nordgren)
2005: Candela (with Kerri Chandler)
2005: Je Ka Jo (with Kerri Chandler)
2000: Àró

Apotek EPs
2014: My Normal Usual Far (with Jonas Kopp and Sally)
2013: Disciple Trail
2011: The Canine EP
2010: Vanishing Point / Weather System
2010: Big Yam
2010: Incidental (with Xhin)
2010: Black Ice / Circus of Life / Bang Me
2009: My Pet Gorilla / Tonto / Museum of Modern
2009: Judgement EP
2008: The Puzzle (Jerome Sydenham's Mighty Dub) / Congo (with Hideo Kobayashi)

Avocado EPs
2010: Inside (with Rune RK)
2009: The Flight (with Rune RK)
2008: Peter Pan / Snow Bored (with Rune RK)
2007: Elephant (with Rune RK)

UK promotion EPs
2010: Sting
2009: Feel It / I'm In / Benevolent Red (with Iroko and Club Lonely)
2009: Powerless / Deep Fried (with Ricky L)
2009: Ecoute! / Jor-El
2008: Darkroom / Sodom
2007: Blacktro (Demo 1) / Spiritual Insurrection (with Joe Claussell)

Other releases
2011: Trombipolution Pt.2, Drumcode
2010: Mutualism System (with Timo Garcia), Noir Music
2010: Trombipolution, Drumcode
2010: Mi Estudio / Two Ninety One (with Pfirter and Function), CLR Records
2010: The Visitation / Rump / Cowboy / The Scavenger, Drumcode

Selected remixes
2010: Dance Disorder – Zusammen, BPitch Control
2010: Dennis Ferrer – The Red Room, Objektivity
2010: Pig & Dan – Addiction, Ground Factory Records
2010: Raiz – Keep Secret (Function, Jerome Sydenham Remixes), Droid Records
2010: Manuyell, Mr. Flavour – Clitter, Full Flava Records
2010: Clara Sofie, Rune RK – Cry Out, Arti Farti
2010: Morris T – Break of Dawn, Rebirth
2009: Planetary Assault Systems – GT (Function & Jerome Sydenham Remix), Mote Evolver
2009: Carl Craig – Angel, Planet E Communications
2009: Adam Beyer, Joel Mull – Forming Dies, Drumcode
2008: Ken Ishii – Cubitos De Hielo, 70 Drums
2007: Faze Action – In The Trees, Juno Records
2007: Ten City – That's The Way Love Is, Ibadan Records
2007: Solaris Heights – Vice, Renaissance Records
2007: Len Faki – Rainbow Delta, Ostgut Ton
2006: Julien Jabre – Swimming Places, Defected Records
2006: Copyright – He Is (with Dennis Ferrer), Defected Records
1999: Beth Orton – Central Reservation (with Joe Claussell), Arista Records
1998: Kerri Chandler – Atmosphere
1998: Faze Action – Moving Cities, F111 / Warner Bros. Records
1993: Nature Soul – Latinize, Ibadan Records

DJ mixes/ and compilations
2008: Need 2 Soul with Ron Trent, Need2Soul
2007: Pan-African Electro (Vol. 1), Ibadan Records
2007: Museum Thalia CD 1 mixed by Jerome Sydenham, New World Records
2006: Space Lab Yellow – Jerome Sydenham Live Vol. 1, Ibadan Records / P-Vine Records
2005: Ibadan People, Ibadan Records
2003: Explosive Hi-Fidelity Sounds, Ibadan Records / BBE
2002: Electric Pussycat, BBE

See also
 List of house music artists

References

External links
 Discography at Discogs

1967 births
Living people
Club DJs
English techno musicians
People from Ibadan
English record producers
Black British musicians
Nigerian people of British descent
Nigerian people of Jamaican descent
21st-century Nigerian musicians
Electronic dance music DJs
Barely Breaking Even artists